"I'm Getting Ready" is an EP and song by British soul musician Michael Kiwanuka. The I'm Getting Ready EP was first released in the United Kingdom on 24 July 2011. Following the release of Kiwanuka's debut single "Home Again", "I'm Getting Ready" was issued as the second single taken from his debut studio album, Home Again on 11 March 2012. For the single release, "I'm Getting Ready" was playlisted by both BBC Radio 1 and BBC Radio 2.

Music videos
Two music videos have been produced for "I'm Getting Ready". The first video was released in September 2011 by Communion Records in promotion of Kiwanuka's I'm Getting Ready EP. The second video was released in February 2012 by Polydor and accompanied the single release of "I'm Getting Ready".

Track listing

Chart performance
On 8 January 2012, "I'm Getting Ready" debuted at number twenty-six on the UK independent releases chart.

Release history

References

2011 EPs
Polydor Records EPs
Michael Kiwanuka albums
Songs written by Michael Kiwanuka
Michael Kiwanuka songs